= Great George Street Waltz =

Canadian folk song from Prince Edward Island

The Great George Street Waltz was written by George Brothers, who named the song after a street in Charlottetown, Prince Edward Island.

== Recordings ==
- "The Fiddle Music of Western Prince Edward Island", Rounder CD 7014 (Brothers accompanies fiddlers Peter Doiron & Adam Driscol on his guitar on this recording)
- "Let's Do Something", Bill Evans and Megan Lynch, Native and Fine Records 906-8
